Yuh-Line Niou (born July 15, 1983) is a Taiwanese-American politician who served as a member of the New York State Assembly for the 65th district. The Lower Manhattan district, which is heavily Democratic and over 40% Asian American, includes Chinatown, the Financial District, Battery Park City, and the Lower East Side. Niou is the first Asian American elected to the State Assembly for the district. She was a candidate for Congress in New York's newly redrawn 10th congressional district in 2022.

Early life and education
Niou was born in Taipei, Taiwan, the eldest of three children, and emigrated to the U.S. with her parents when she was six months old. Her mother worked as a registered nurse and hospital administrator while her father worked as a materials science engineer. They were both from Taoyuan, Taiwan. Her father received a Ph.D. in materials science and engineering from Oregon Graduate Institute of Science & Technology and worked as a senior research scientist at the University of Texas at El Paso and senior engineer at WaferTech in Camas, Washington for over a decade. From 2001 to 2010, her father worked as a senior director at Semiconductor Manufacturing International Corporation (SMIC), a Chinese-state owned company, in Shanghai, China. Her mother also worked as an assistant director of environment, safety, and health at the company during this time. She lived in Moscow, Idaho, and El Paso, Texas, before her parents settled in Vancouver, Washington. She attended and graduated from Columbia River High School.

Niou earned her Bachelor of Arts in social policy from Evergreen State College and worked as a legislative assistant to State Representative Eileen Cody and Senator Debbie Regala of the Washington State Legislature. She was diagnosed with autism at 22. She moved to New York City in 2010 to obtain a Master of Public Administration (MPA) from Baruch College, and served as chief of staff to Ron Kim, a member of the New York State Assembly. In a 2016 interview, Niou said that she first publicly discussed her autism diagnosis with a group of parents representing Autism Speaks who visited Kim's office. Niou also worked as a lobbyist in Washington state.

New York State Assembly

Elections
After a corruption scandal involving Sheldon Silver forced his resignation, a special election was held to fill the vacancy in April 2016. Alice Cancel, an ally of Silver and a local Democratic District leader, ran as the nominee of the Democratic Party, while Niou, with the encouragement of former State Senator Daniel Squadron, ran as the Working Families Party candidate. Cancel won the election.

Niou ran for the seat again in the 2016 Democratic primary and won the Democratic nomination in August 2016. She then won the general election in November 2016 with 76% of the vote.

In 2018 Niou was uncontested in the primary and general elections. In 2020, Grace Lee ran against Niou in the Democratic primary, receiving 35.7% of the vote to Niou's 64%. Niou was uncontested in the 2020 general election.

Tenure
Since her election to the New York State Assembly, Niou has prioritized legislation related to consumer protection and tenants rights as well as advocating for increased funding for the New York City Housing Authority (NYCHA). She has also worked to prevent a new housing and office building from being developed on community supported green space, the Elizabeth Street Garden. Eventually, the garden's nonprofit lost the battle to save the space, which had begun in 2012, prior to Niou's election.

In January 2019, during an assembly hearing regarding the Child Victims Act, Niou recounted her own sexual assault. The act passed in the state Assembly that day with a vote of 130–3. In the same year, she voted to ban the possession of firearms on school campuses with the exception of school's police officers and security guards, prohibit the manufacturing, sale, or ownership of untraceable 3D printed firearms, and establish a firearm buyback program in New York. All bills passed the State Assembly and State Senate and were signed into law by New York's then-Gov. Andrew Cuomo.

In 2022, she voted to expand legal protections for abortion providers in New York, prohibit arrests for lawful abortions, and prohibit extradition of abortion providers to other states. Both bills passed the State Assembly and State Senate and were signed into law by Gov. Kathy Hochul in June 2022.

As a member of the State Assembly, Niou served as the Chair of the Subcommittee on Catastrophic Natural Disasters that focuses on combating climate change and building a safer New York when disaster strikes, and Co-Chair of the Asian Pacific American Task Force that focuses on fighting anti-Asian bigotry and hate crimes in the wake of the coronavirus pandemic.

2022 congressional candidacy
In December 2021, Niou stated her intention to issue a primary challenge against state Senator Brian P. Kavanagh of New York's 26th State Senate district. In May 2022, Niou announced she was instead running for Congress in New York's 10th congressional district. She was endorsed by the Working Families Party, Sunrise Movement NYC, New York Communities for Change, New York City Public Advocate Jumaane Williams, State Sen. Julia Salazar, State Assemblymember Ron Kim, Mayor of Boston Michelle Wu, former gubernatorial candidate Cynthia Nixon, former candidate for Manhattan District Attorney Tahanie Aboushi, and dozens of other elected officials, activists, and organizations. 

Niou garnered about 1,300 fewer votes than Dan Goldman in the crowded Democratic primary from in-person ballots according to the Associated Press. While the race was not certified by the New York City Board of Elections until September 14, she conceded the primary on September 6 after most of the remaining absentee ballots had been counted. She decided against a third-party challenge to Goldman using the Working Families Party ballot line in the general election, citing her priority of defending democracy in other competitive races and lack of resources needed to mount a serious challenge against the Democratic nominee.

Goldman won the general election with 84% of the vote.

Political positions

Abortions
Niou has a 100% rating from Planned Parenthood for her support of abortion rights. She has voted to expand legal protections for abortion providers in New York and prohibit extradition of abortion providers to other states. She said codifying abortion rights is one of her first priorities if she were to be elected to Congress in an interview with New York Magazine.

Criminal justice 
In 2019, Niou voted in favor of a criminal justice reform bill that prohibits the use of cash bail for misdemeanors and non-violent felonies, requires both defendants and prosecutors to share all evidence in their possession in advance of trials, and mandates all misdemeanor and felony cases in the state of New York to be resolved within 90 and 180 days, respectively. It passed both the State Assembly and Senate and was signed into law by New York's then-Gov. Andrew Cuomo in April of 2019. Under the reform, judges retain the abil­ity to set bail in, for example, cases that involve a viol­ent felony, a defendant who is charged while on probation, or are considered high-risk.

During a series of civil unrest triggered by the murder of George Floyd in 2020, Niou criticized the police for "escalating tensions or resorting to violence" and called for creating a culture of accountability and fairness within law enforcement. She also supports efforts to defund the police in order to redirect the funds toward social services, education, and housing.

Guns
Niou has a 0% rating from the National Rifle Association (NRA). She has voted to expand red flag laws, require license for possession of a semi-automatic firearm, prohibit the sale of ghost guns, and authorize the State of New York to sue gun manufactures for damage caused by their guns. She is in favor of banning assault rifles and assault weapons.

Healthcare
Niou supports a nationwide single-payer health care system and has been a supporter of the New York Health Act introduced by fellow Assemblymember Richard N. Gottfried, which would establish a statewide single-payer health plan if passed.

In 2021, Niou co-introduced and cosponsored legislation to expand the practice of applied behavior analysis in New York State. It was signed into law on Dec. 30, 2021 and will take effect June 30, 2023.

Housing
In 2019, Niou supported a controversial lawsuit to stop a Habitat for Humanity affordable housing development for seniors in Elizabeth Street Garden in Little Italy.  

Niou supports allocating 100 percent of residential units in the proposed 5 World Trade Center in Lower Manhattan as affordable housing.

Judiciary
Niou supports expanding the Supreme Court of the United States and implementing term limits on Justices. In the wake of the Dobbs decision that overturned Roe v. Wade, she again advocated for expanding the court, citing concern over further erosion of constitutional rights to privacy with respect to intimate practices as established by Griswold v. Connecticut.

Environment
Niou supports the Green New Deal.  She has been endorsed by Sunrise Movement NYC for her campaign for New York's 10th congressional district in 2022.

Foreign policy

Israel
Niou supports a negotiated solution to the conflict between Israel and the Palestinians. Niou also supports providing Israel with defensive military equipment to ensure the country's ability to protect itself and believes the people of Israel deserve to "live in safety and security." However, she approves including restrictions on United States foreign aid to Israel that would prevent the use of tax dollars for harm or violations against human rights. It has also been alleged that Niou supports the BDS Movement, which calls for boycotts, divestment and sanctions against Israel; Niou has consistently stated that she’s never personally boycotted Israel and believes the Middle Eastern country has the right to exist, but she opposes anti-BDS laws on First Amendment grounds.

See also 
 Chinese Americans in New York City
 List of Taiwanese Americans
 New York State Legislature
 Taiwanese Americans in New York City

References

External links
New York State Assemblymember Yuh-Line Niou official site

1983 births
21st-century American politicians
21st-century American women politicians
American politicians of Taiwanese descent
American women of Taiwanese descent in politics
Asian-American people in New York (state) politics
Baruch College alumni
Candidates in the 2022 United States House of Representatives elections
Evergreen State College alumni
Hakka people
Living people
New York (state) Democrats
People from Manhattan
People on the autism spectrum
Politicians from Beaverton, Oregon
Politicians from Taipei
Taiwanese emigrants to the United States
Women state legislators in New York (state)